was a Japanese actor who appeared in such films as Toshio Matsumoto's surreal Bara No Soretsu (a.k.a. Funeral Parade of Roses) and Akira Kurosawa's Seven Samurai (as the firebrand farmer Rikichi) and Red Beard, and Kihachi Okamoto's Kill!.  He had a long-standing interest in UFOs and wrote several books on the subject.  He preferred starring in science fiction films, usually as aliens, or people possessed by them, in such films as Battle in Outer Space, Monster Zero, and Destroy All Monsters.

Biography
Tsuchiya was born in Kofu, Yamanashi in 1927. His film debut was in the 1952 Shintoho film Murder Suspect (殺人容疑者). During the auditions for Akira Kurosawa's Seven Samurai, Tsuchiya was watching, and was picked by Kurosawa although he originally had no intention of auditioning himself.

Seven Samurai was filmed during the same time as Godzilla, and Tsuchiya would frequently leave the set of Seven Samurai to see Godzilla being filmed. In an interview, Tsuchiya said "Because I was doing Seven Samurai I couldn't appear in the first Godzilla. That's why I insisted they put me in the sequel." Tsuchiya's wish was granted and he appeared in a role in Godzilla Raids Again.

Although Tsuchiya appeared in many films by Akira Kurosawa, he also appeared in many science fiction films, saying "Most actors get comfortable with a certain genre, and they stick to that. But as far as I was concerned, it was equally prestigious to appear in science-fiction films or in Kurosawa movies." Tsuchiya especially liked to play aliens (or people controlled by aliens). When originally given the role of one of the heroes in The Mysterians, he turned down the role in favor of the Mysterian leader, because he was only interested in playing "interesting, strong and/or twisted characters". When director Ishirō Honda told him that since the Mysterian leader wore a mask, his face would not be seen, Tsuchiya said "That's all right. I just want to play the alien!" He has a personal interest in space and even claims to have seen several UFOs. "At the time I was very interested in the Space Race, and belonged to an organization which promoted a mission to the moon. I got all my fellow actors to join - Mifune, Shimura. Then I learned that this organization was crooked and really wanted to divide up the moon and sell it as real estate! I was so outraged that in [The Mysterians] when the earth scientists balk at giving the Mysterians some land on earth, I ad-libbed, 'But you're trying to divide up the moon and sell it!'"

He lobbied for the title role in Tomei Ningen (1954), but was forced by the studio to play the leading man.  Eventually realizing their mistake, he was cast in the title role in The Human Vapor.

He was originally cast to play the assassin Malness in Ghidorah, the Three-Headed Monster, but was unable to because he was filming Red Beard.

In 1991, after a long absence from Toho monster films (his last was in the 1970 film Space Amoeba), Tsuchiya returned to the Godzilla series in Godzilla vs. King Ghidorah as Shindo, a World War II veteran who met a pre-mutated Godzilla during the battle in the Marshall Islands.

Tsuchiya died of lung cancer on February 8, 2017, at the age of 89.

Selected filmography

Film 

 Murder Suspect (殺人容疑者) (1952)
 The Tower of Himeyuri (ひめゆりの塔) (1953)
 Seven Samurai (七人の侍) (1954) - Rikichi
 Kimi shinitamo koto nakare (1954)
 Mitsuyu-sen (1954)
 Tomei Ningen (透明人間) (1954) - Reporter Komatsu
 Zoku tenka taihei (1955)
 Godzilla Raids Again (ゴジラの逆襲) (1955) - Tajima, Member of Osaka Defense Corps
 No Time for Tears (1955) - Maruyama
 Sanjusan go sha otonashi (1955)
 Shin kurama tengu daisanbu (1955)
 Natsume Sôseki no Sanshirô (1955) - Nonomiya
 I Live in Fear (生きものの記録) (1955) - Factory Worker After Fire
 Kyatsu o nigasuna (1956) - Shiraishi
 Migotona musume (1956) - Nobuo Takahara
 Tsuma no kokoro (1956)
 Throne of Blood (蜘蛛巣城) (1957) - Washizu samurai
 Ninjitsu (1957)
 Tokyo da you okkasan (1957)
 Salaryman shusse taikôki (1957) - Maruo
 Chieko-sho (1957) - KoYama
 Waga mune ni niji wa kiezu (1957) - Takeshi Shimada
 The Mysterians (地球防衛軍) (1957) - Leader of the Mysterians
 Kajikko (1958)
 Song for a Bride (花嫁三重奏) (1958)
 Rickshaw Man (1958)
 Anzukko (1958) - Ishima
 Bijo to ekitai ningen (1958) - Detective Taguchi
 Yatsu ga satsujinsha da (1958)
 Josei SOS (1958)
 Varan the Unbelievable (1958) - Military Officer Katsumoto
 The Hidden Fortress (1958) - Samurai on horse
 Kotan no kuchibue (1959)
 Oshaberi okusan (1959)
 Sensuikan I-57 kofuku sezu (1959)
 Battle in Outer Space (宇宙大戦争) (1959) - Iwomura
 Densô ningen (1960) - Det. Capt. Okazaki
 Hawai Middowei daikaikûsen: Taiheiyô no arashi (1960)
 Daigaku no sanzôkutachi (1960) - Detective Director Iwano
 Man Against Man (1960) - Detective Yoshizawa
 The Bad Sleep Well (1960) - ADA secretary
 The Human Vapor (ガス人間第一号) (1960) - Mizuno the Librarian
 Hurricane of the Pacific (1960)
 Yojimbo (用心棒) (1961) - Kohei
 Death on the Mountain (1961) - Jiro Makita
 Daigaku no wakadaishô (1961)
 Sanjuro (椿三十郎) (1962) - Samurai
 Kurenai no sora (1962)
 Doburoku no Tatsu (1962) - Kida
 Chikata nikki (1962)
 Chûshingura (1962) - Matanojô Shiota
 Varan the Unbelievable (1962) - Soldier
 Attack Squadron! (1963)
 Roppongi no yoru: aishite aishite (1963) - Inspector Ihara
 Nippon jitsuwa jidai (1963)
 High and Low (天国と地獄) (1963) - Detective Murata
 500,000 (1963) - Yamazaki
 Matango (1963) - Masafumi Kasai - Owner
 Hiken (1963)
 Red Beard (赤ひげ) (1965) - Dr. Handayû Mori
 Taiheiyô kiseki no sakusen: Kisuka (1965) - Terai
 Frankenstein vs. Baragon (フランケンシュタイン対地底怪獣バラゴン) (1965) - Mr. Kawai
 Beast Alley (1965) - Katsuragi
 Aku no kaidan (1965) - Detective
 Invasion of Astro-Monster (怪獣大戦争 a.k.a. Godzilla vs. Monster Zero) (1965) - Controller of Planet X
 Musekinin Shimizu Minato (1966)
 Hikinige (1966) - Shuichi
 Zero faita dai kûsen (1966)
 Kokusai himitsu keisatsu: Zettai zetsumei (1967) - General Rubesa
 Sasaki Kojiro (1967) - Heisuke Ichinami
 Japan's Longest Day (1967) - Lt. Colonel Hiroshi Fuha - Eastern District Army Staff Officer
 Two in the Shadow (1967) - Yumiko's husband
 Son of Godzilla (怪獣島の決戦 ゴジラの息子) (1967) - Furukawa
 Booted Babe, Busted Boss (1968) - Kurokawa / Killer
 Kill! (斬る) (1968) - Shinroku Matsuo
 Destroy All Monsters (怪獣総進撃) (1968) - Dr. Otani
 Rengô kantai shirei chôkan: Yamamoto Isoroku (1968) - Staff Officer Kuroshima
 Koi ni mezameru koro (1969) - Shunsaku Yamamoto
 Battle of the Japan Sea (1969) - Staff Officer Akiyama
 Funeral Parade of Roses (薔薇の葬列) (1969) - Gonda
 Machibuse (1970) - Itahachi
 Space Amoeba (ゲゾラ・ガニメ・カメーバ 決戦!南海の大怪獣) (1970) - Dr. Kyoichi Mida
 The Militarists (1970) - Okabe (uncredited)
 Kuro no shamen (1971)
 Zatoichi's Conspiracy (1973) - Superintendent Shobei
 Nishijin Shinju (1977) - Yoshida
 Karuizawa fujin (1982) - Gen'ichirô Nakagawa
 Shōsetsu Yoshida gakkō (小説吉田学校) (1983) - Jōji Hayashi 
 Rûju (1984) - Akio Tsuchiya
 Tokyo: The Last War (帝都大戦) (1989) - Dr. Mizuno
 Earth Defense Girl Iko-chan: The Great Oedo Operation (地球防衛少女イコちゃん 大江戸大作戦) (1990) - Dr. Mizuno (voice)
 Godzilla vs. King Ghidorah (ゴジラVSキングギドラ) (1991) - Businessman Yasuaki Shindo
 Kidan (2005)
 Yamauchi Keisuke: The Kayô Movie Shôwa kayô kiki ippatsu! (2014) - (final film role)
 Mifune: The Last Samurai (2015) - as Himself

TV Series 
 Taikōki (1965)
 Ultra Q (ウルトラQ) (1966) - Ono (episode 2)
 Ultraman (ウルトラマン) (1966) - Dr. Morita (episode 18)
 Ultraseven (ウルトラセブン) (1967) - Dr. Tsuchida (episodes 14 and 15)
 Haru no Sakamichi (1971) as Ōtani Yoshitsugu
 Daichūshingura (1971) as Tsuchiya Chikara
 Taiyō ni Hoero! (1973) (episode 73)
 Katsu Kaishū (1974) as Kimura Hyogo
 Onihei Hankachō (1975) (episode14)
 Daitokai Part2 (1977) (episode 29) as Inoue Yukio
 Kage no Gundan III (1982) (episode17) as Okudaira Tadatsune
 Haru no Hatō (1985) - Inoue Kaoru
 Onihei Hankachō (1989) (episode7)

References 

Tucker, Guy Marriner.  Age of the Gods.

External links 

1927 births
2017 deaths
Japanese male actors